David Brooks Robinson (born 26 October 1939) is a retired United States Navy vice admiral. He served as commander, Naval Surface Force Pacific from 1993 to 1996. Robinson was awarded the Navy Cross for his actions as the commanding officer of a patrol gunboat in Vietnam.

Early life and education
Born in Alexandria, Louisiana and raised in Denton, Texas, Robinson graduated from Denton Senior High School in 1958. He then studied at Texas A&M University for one year before being appointed to the United States Naval Academy in 1959. Robinson graduated in June 1963 with a B.S. degree in naval science. He later earned an M.S. degree in oceanography from the Naval Postgraduate School in October 1969. His thesis was entitled Seiching in Monterey Bay.

Military career
During a patrol mission up the Bồ Đề River on 11 August 1970, Canon came under simultaneous fire from enemy forces concealed on both shores. Despite a broken leg and shrapnel wounds from a rocket explosion, Robinson directed return fire until the attack was suppressed. He then remained at his post strapped to a upright stretcher until Canon was safely moored at a forward base upstream. Robinson was subsequently awarded the Navy Cross for his actions.

Robinson served as the executive officer of the guided missile destroyer  from October 1974 to April 1976. He then served as the commanding officer of the guided missile destroyer  from April 1976 to July 1978. Robinson later served as the commanding officer of the guided missile cruiser USS Richmond K. Turner from January 1983 to July 1984.

As a flag officer, Robinson commanded Cruiser Destroyer Group 8 from July 1988 to August 1989. He then served as Vice Director and Director for Operational Plans and Interoperability on the Joint Staff from September 1989 to December 1991, which included Pentagon oversight and analysis of Gulf War operations. Robinson next became Deputy Commander-in-Chief and Chief of Staff for the U.S. Pacific Fleet in January 1992.

In April 1993, Robinson was promoted to vice admiral and assumed command of the Naval Surface Force, U.S. Pacific Fleet.

Personal
Robinson married Juliet Gene Kirkpatrick (22 March 1940 – 12 October 2005) on 1 August 1964 in Denton, Texas. They have two sons and five grandchildren.

References

1939 births
Living people
People from Alexandria, Louisiana
People from Denton, Texas
Texas A&M University alumni
United States Naval Academy alumni
Naval Postgraduate School alumni
United States Navy personnel of the Vietnam War
Recipients of the Navy Cross (United States)
United States Navy personnel of the Gulf War
Recipients of the Meritorious Service Medal (United States)
Recipients of the Legion of Merit
United States Navy admirals
Recipients of the Navy Distinguished Service Medal
Recipients of the Defense Distinguished Service Medal